Adriana Pérez (born November 20, 1992) is a Venezuelan former professional tennis player and member of the Venezuela Fed Cup team. In April 2014, she reached her highest singles ranking by the WTA of No. 186, whilst her best doubles ranking was world No. 152, achieved in August 2013.

ITF Circuit finals

Singles: 11 (7–4)

Doubles: 14 (9–5)

References

External links
 
 
 

1992 births
Living people
People from Anzoátegui
Venezuelan female tennis players
Tennis players at the 2010 Summer Youth Olympics
Tennis players at the 2011 Pan American Games
Pan American Games competitors for Venezuela
Central American and Caribbean Games silver medalists for Venezuela
South American Games silver medalists for Venezuela
South American Games gold medalists for Venezuela
South American Games medalists in tennis
Competitors at the 2010 South American Games
Competitors at the 2014 South American Games
Competitors at the 2014 Central American and Caribbean Games
Central American and Caribbean Games medalists in tennis
20th-century Venezuelan women
21st-century Venezuelan women